Trichohathliodes is a monotypic beetle genus in the family Cerambycidae described by Stephan von Breuning in 1959. Its only species, Trichohathliodes molitorius, was described by Per Olof Christopher Aurivillius in 1917.

References

Pteropliini
Beetles described in 1917
Monotypic beetle genera